L. malaccensis  may refer to:
 Lasiococca malaccensis, a synonym of Lasiococca brevipes, a tree species found in Southeast Asia
 Lindera malaccensis, a synonym for Lindera lucida, a plant species found in Malaysia

See also
 Malaccensis (disambiguation)